The 2022 Wofford Terriers football team represents Wofford College as a member of the Southern Conference (SoCon) during the 2022 NCAA Division I FCS football season. The Terriers are led by fifth-year head coach Josh Conklin and play their home games at Gibbs Stadium in Spartanburg, South Carolina. Conklin resigned as head coach following their fifth game and Shawn Watson was promoted to interim head coach for the remainder of the season.

Previous season

The Terriers finished the 2021 season with a record of 1–10, 0–8 SoCon play to finish in last place.

Schedule

Game summaries

at No. 12 Chattanooga

Elon

at Virginia Tech

at Kennesaw State

No. 13 Mercer

at No. 13 Samford

The Citadel

East Tennessee State

at Western Carolina

VMI

at No. 12 Furman

References

Wofford
Wofford Terriers football seasons
Wofford Terriers football